On Numbers and Games is a mathematics book by John Horton Conway first published in 1976. The book is  written by a pre-eminent mathematician, and is directed at other mathematicians. The material is, however, developed in a playful and unpretentious manner and many chapters are accessible to non-mathematicians.  Martin Gardner discussed the book at length, particularly Conway's construction of surreal numbers, in his Mathematical Games column in Scientific American in September 1976.

The book is roughly divided into two sections: the first half (or Zeroth Part), on numbers, the second half (or First Part), on games. In the Zeroth Part, Conway provides axioms for arithmetic: addition, subtraction, multiplication, division and inequality. This allows an axiomatic construction of numbers and ordinal arithmetic, namely, the integers, reals, the countable infinity, and entire towers of infinite ordinals. The object to which these axioms apply takes the form {L|R}, which can be interpreted as a specialized kind of set; a kind of two-sided set. By insisting that L<R, this two-sided set resembles the Dedekind cut. The resulting construction yields a field, now called the surreal numbers. The ordinals are embedded in this field. The construction is rooted in axiomatic set theory, and is closely related to the Zermelo–Fraenkel axioms. In the original book, Conway simply refers to this field as "the numbers". The term "surreal numbers" is adopted later, at the suggestion of Donald Knuth.

In the First Part, Conway notes that, by dropping the constraint that L<R, the axioms still apply and the construction goes through, but the resulting objects can no longer be interpreted as numbers. They can be interpreted as the class of all two-player games. The axioms for greater than and less than are seen to be a natural ordering on games, corresponding to which of the two players may win. The remainder of the book is devoted to exploring a number of different (non-traditional, mathematically inspired) two-player games, such as nim, hackenbush, and the map-coloring games col and snort. The development includes their scoring, a review of the Sprague–Grundy theorem, and the inter-relationships to numbers, including their relationship to infinitesimals.

The book was first published by Academic Press Inc in 1976, and re-released by AK Peters in 2000.

Zeroth Part ... On Numbers 

In the Zeroth Part, Chapter 0, Conway introduces a specialized form of set notation, having the form {L|R}, where L and R are again of this form, built recursively, terminating in {|}, which is to be read as an analog of the empty set. Given this object, axiomatic definitions for addition, subtraction, multiplication, division and inequality may be given. As long as one insists that L<R (with this holding vacuously true when L or R are the empty set), then the resulting class of objects can be interpreted as numbers, the surreal numbers. The {L|R} notation then resembles the Dedekind cut.

The ordinal  is built by transfinite induction. As with conventional ordinals,  can be defined.

The construction enables an entire zoo of peculiar numbers, the surreals, which form a field.

First Part ... and Games 
In the First Part, Conway abandons the constraint that L<R, and then interprets the form {L|R} as a two-player game: a position in a contest between two players, Left and Right.  Each player has a set of games called options to choose from in turn.  Games are written {L|R} where L is the set of Left's options and R is the set of Right's options. At the start there are no games at all, so the empty set (i.e., the set with no members) is the only set of options we can provide to the players.  This defines the game {|}, which is called 0.  We consider a player who must play a turn but has no options to have lost the game.  Given this game 0 there are now two possible sets of options, the empty set and the set whose only element is zero.  The game {0|} is called 1, and the game {|0} is called -1.  The game {0|0} is called * (star), and is the first game we find that is not a number.

All numbers are positive, negative, or zero, and we say that a game is positive if Left has a winning strategy, negative if Right has a winning strategy, or zero if the second player has a winning strategy.  Games that are not numbers have a fourth possibility: they may be fuzzy, meaning that the first player has a winning strategy.  * is a fuzzy game.

See also
 Winning Ways for your Mathematical Plays

References

1976 non-fiction books
Combinatorial game theory
Mathematics books
Systems of set theory
John Horton Conway
Academic Press books